USS Taurus (PHM-3) was the third ship of her class of hydrofoils operated by the United States Navy. Pegasus class vessels were designed for high speed and mobility, and carried a powerful (for their size) armament.  The ship was named for the constellation Taurus.

In November 1972, The United States, Germany and Italy signed a Memorandum of Understanding to share the cost of the development of a Patrol Missile Hydrofoil. This brought about the building of the Pegasus class . The Taurus was the first production model.

See also
 List of patrol vessels of the United States Navy

References

External links 
 
 Navysite.de PHM-3 page
 

Pegasus-class hydrofoils
Patrol vessels of the United States Navy
Ships built in Renton, Washington
1981 ships